Bryan Defares (born 14 June 1981) is a Dutch former basketball player. Defares was a member of the Dutch national basketball team from 2004 till 2012.

College career
While at Boise State University, DeFares reached the school’s 1,000 points club and is in the Top 10 in Games Played, Free Throws, Free Throw Attempts and Assists.  Bryan also holds BSU’s Single Game Assists record with 13 assists vs. UNLV in 2004.  DeFares helped lead the Broncos the 2004 NIT Sweet Sixteen.

Professional career
Professionally, Defares was named the Bosman Player of the Year while playing for Peristeri (Greece).

Defares enjoyed an extensive playing career, beginning with his high school and AAU years.  Defares helped lead Tamalpais High School (Mill Valley, California) to a California state championship in 2000.  He played with Oakland (Slam-n-Jam) Soldiers in 1999-2000 for Coach Ken Carter, whom the 2005 MTV/Tollin-Robbins produced film Coach Carter, starring Samuel L. Jackson, was based.

Present
Currently, DeFares is an assistant basketball coach at Treasure Valley Community College in Ontario, Oregon.  He received a BA in Social Science with a minor in Economics from Boise State University and is employed by the Boise School District.

References

External links
 Profile at eurobasket.com

1981 births
Living people
Boise State Broncos men's basketball players
Donar (basketball club) players
Dutch Basketball League players
Dutch men's basketball players
Gijón Baloncesto players
Newcastle Eagles players
Point guards
Basketball players from Amsterdam
Tamalpais High School alumni
West-Brabant Giants players